Aleksandr Arkadyevich Yanovsky (born November 1, 1952) is a Russian professional football coach and a former player. Currently, he works as an assistant coach with FC Alania Vladikavkaz.

External links
  Career profile at KLISF

1952 births
Living people
Soviet footballers
FC Spartak Vladikavkaz players
FC SKA Rostov-on-Don players
FC Lokomotiv Moscow players
Pakhtakor Tashkent FK players
Russian football managers
FC Spartak Vladikavkaz managers
Russian Premier League managers
Association football goalkeepers